Zachary Eric Mills (born May 1, 1982) is a former American football quarterback. He was an All-Big Ten selection and four-year starter at Penn State University.

High school
Mills attended Urbana High School with Nate A. Foster in Frederick County, Maryland from 1996 to 2000, where he led the school's football team to consecutive 2A state championships in 1998 and 1999, going undefeated both years. In the course of his high school career he broke Maryland public school records both for passing yards (5,638) and touchdown passes (59) and won countless awards including first team All-CMC and first team All-Mid-Maryland. Mills was also a standout on the basketball team.

College
As the quarterback of the Nittany Lions from 2001 to 2004, Mills led the team to the Capital One Bowl in the 2002 season. Mills was a three-time Davey O'Brien Award finalist and was presented with the 2004 Hall Foundation Award as Penn State's outstanding senior football player.  In 2002 Mills was named All-Big Ten. 

Mills holds many Penn State passing and total offense records: He finished his career with a school record 7,796 yards of total offense, 41 career touchdown passes (since broken by Daryll Clark, Matt McGloin, Christian Hackenberg, and Trace McSorley, and 16 career 200-yard passing games. Mills is the first Nittany Lion under head coach Joe Paterno to throw, catch, and run for a touchdown in a single game (in 2004 versus Akron). He wore jersey number 7.

He graduated in 2004 with a Bachelor of Science in Kinesiology.

NFL
Mills spent the 2005 preseason in the Washington Redskins' training camp as an undrafted free agent, but was released before the season began. He pulled his hamstring early in camp and the injury prevented Mills from participating in most drills.
He wore jersey number 14.

Wilkes-Barre/Scranton Pioneers
Mills signed with the Wilkes-Barre/Scranton Pioneers of the af2, a minor league of the Arena Football League in the Spring of 2007 but left the team a few weeks later.

Coaching
In 2006, Mills served as an assistant coach at Temple under first-year head coach (and fellow Penn State alumnus), Al Golden. He joined the coaching staff at The Haverford School in Haverford, Pennsylvania as quarterbacks coach in 2007, leaving the team after the 2010 season.

References

External links
"Passing into history: Mills moves on from PSU career, leaves behind lasting QB legacy", Jenny Vrentas, The Digital Collegian, March 3, 2005
"Mills' agent optimistic about NFL prospects," The Digital Collegian, March 16, 2005
"NFL draft analysis for Zack Mills"
"Passing into History," The Digital Collegian, March 3, 2005
"Zack Mills Named Senior MVP At Nittany Lion Football Banquet" gopsusports.com, December 12, 2004
PSU’s Mills enjoying retirement, The Citizens' Voice, July 20, 2007.
Haverford School Football, haverfordpafootball.vnsports.com, January 5, 2012.

1982 births
Living people
American football quarterbacks
Penn State Nittany Lions football players
Temple Owls football coaches
Wilkes-Barre/Scranton Pioneers players
High school football coaches in Pennsylvania
People from Frederick County, Maryland
Players of American football from Maryland